Meluan may refer to:
Meluan (state constituency), represented in the Sarawak State Legislative Assembly
Meluan, a coaster in service 1947-55